The 3rd Vermont Infantry Regiment was a three-years infantry regiment in the Union Army during the American Civil War. It served in the eastern theater, predominantly in the VI Corps, Army of the Potomac, from July 1861 to July 1865. It was a member of the Vermont Brigade.

History

In July 1861, the United States Congress authorized President Abraham Lincoln to call out 500,000 men, to serve for three years unless sooner discharged. The 3rd Vermont Infantry was the second of the three years regiments from the state placed in the field as a result of this call. It was organized from militia companies from Springfield, Coventry, Newbury (Wells River), Charleston, Johnson, Hartford, St.Johnsbury, St. Albans, Guidhall, and East Montpelier and Calais.

Governor Erastus Fairbanks' first choices to command the regiment were Colonel John W. Phelps, soon to relinquish his command of the 1st Vermont Infantry, Captain Truman Seymour, 4th U.S. Artillery, a native Vermonter who had been present at the Confederate attack on Fort Sumter, and Captain A. V. Colburn, U.S. Army, who later became Assistant Adjutant General of the Army of the Potomac under General George B. McClellan. Phelps, however, was serving as commandant of the post at Newport News, Virginia, and the offers to Seymour and Colburn were declined.

The regiment rendezvoused at St. Johnsbury, on the ground of the Caledonia County Agricultural Society at "Camp Baxter," named in honor of Adjutant and Inspector General H. Henry Baxter. The regiment mustered into United States service on July 16, 1861, and departed for Washington, D.C. on July 24, under the temporary command of Lieutenant Colonel Breed N. Hyde. At Hartford, Connecticut, the regiment's commander, Colonel William Farrar Smith, joined them.

The regiment arrived in Washington, D.C. on July 25, 1861, and on July 27, marched up the Potomac to the Chain Bridge, where they built "Camp Lyon." They joined at that site the 6th Maine Infantry, Mott's Battery and a company of cavalry. By August 12, the 2nd Vermont Infantry and the 33rd New York Infantry had joined them.

Major Walter W. Cochran, of Bellows Falls, resigned his commission on August 6 due to a severe attack of fever and ague. Captain Wheelock G. Veazey, of Company A, replaced him. On August 13, Colonel Smith was appointed brigadier general of volunteers, and Hyde replaced him, now as a full colonel. Veazey was promoted to lieutenant colonel, and Captain Thomas O. Seaver, of Company F, was promoted to major.

It was also here that Private William Scott, known to history as the Sleeping Sentinel, was found asleep at his post on August 31, court-martialed, and sentenced to be executed.  President Lincoln heard about the case, pardoned Scott, and returned him to his unit. William Scott was actually standing before a firing squad when the death sentence and pardon were both read, however no one had told him that he had been pardoned prior to being sent to the firing squad.  Scott later was killed in action at the Battle of Lee's Mill (a/k/a Dam No. 1).

On September 3, the units crossed the Chain Bridge, and occupied "Camp Advance,"  in advance of the bridge.  On September 9, Private Scott was scheduled to be executed, but during the proceedings, after the death sentence had been read, a pardon was read, sparing his life. In 1997, the original court-martial and pardon papers were discovered, and authenticated, bringing to an end the controversy over whether President Lincoln had personally signed the pardon, which it turned out he did. Scott served faithfully with his regiment until the Battle at Lee's Mill, where he was mortally wounded, and was buried in the national cemetery at Yorktown.

On September 11, the regiment participated in a reconnaissance to and beyond Lewinsville, Virginia, where it engaged Confederate skirmishers. Returning to the camp, the regiment came under fire from Rosser's battery. A shell fell within the ranks of Company C, killing Private Amos Meserve, mortally wounding William H. Colburn, and injuring five others. On September 25, the regiment participated in another reconnaissance to Lewinsville, but suffered no casualties. Quartermaster Redfield Proctor resigned from the regiment on this date to accept appointment as Major of the 5th Vermont Infantry.

During the next two weeks, the 4th and 5th Vermont regiments joined Smith's division. On October 9, the Vermont regiments moved to Camp Griffin, about four miles from Chain Bridge. Here, on October 24, the 6th Vermont Infantry arrived, completing the initial organization of the "Old Vermont Brigade."

The history of the regiment from this point on is essentially that of the Vermont Brigade.

The original members of the regiment, who did not reenlist, were mustered out of the service on July 27, 1864. Veterans and recruits were consolidated into six companies, July 25, 1864. One year recruits and others whose term of service was due to expire prior to October 1, 1865, were mustered out on June 19, 1865. The remaining officers and men mustered out of service on July 11.

Medal of Honor

Six members of the regiment were awarded the Medal of Honor.
 Beattie, Alexander M., Captain, Co. F, " removed, under a hot fire, a wounded member of his command to a place of safety," at the Battle of Cold Harbor, June 5, 1864.
 Hawkins, Gardner C., 1st Lieutenant, Co. E, "when the lines were wavering from the well-directed fire of the enemy, this officer, acting adjutant of the regiment, sprang forward, and with encouraging words cheered the soldiers on and, although dangerously wounded, refused to leave the field until the enemy's works were taken," at the Battle of Petersburg, on April 2, 1865.
 Johnston, Willie, Musician Company D, 3rd Vermont Infantry The second Medal of Honor ever awarded.
 Pingree, Samuel E., Captain, Co. F, "gallantly led his Co. across a wide, deep creek, drove the enemy from the rifle pits, which were within 2 yards of the farther bank, and remained at the head of his men until a second time severely wounded," at the Battle at Lee's Mills, April 16, 1862.
 Scott, Julian A., Drummer, Co. E, "crossed the creek under a terrific fire of musketry several times to assist in bringing off the wounded," at the Battle at Lee's Mills, April 16, 1862.
 Seaver, Thomas O., Colonel, while "at the head of 3 regiments and under a most galling fire, attacked and occupied the enemy's works," at the Battle of Spotsylvania, May 10, 1864.

Engagements

Final Statement

See also
 Vermont in the Civil War
 Vermont Brigade

Notes/References

Bibliography

External links
 Vermont in the Civil War
 Vermont National Guard Library and Museum
 Vermont Military Records Project, Vermont Public Records Division
 William Scott, The Sleeping Sentinel

Units and formations of the Union Army from Vermont
Vermont Brigade
1861 establishments in Vermont
Vermont in the American Civil War